St. Willebrord Catholic Church is a parish of the Roman Catholic Diocese of Green Bay located in downtown Green Bay, Wisconsin. It was founded in 1864 by Dutch immigrants, and dedicated to St. Willibrord. The church is spelled Willebrord (with an "e" in the middle) because stonemasons made a mistake when carving the name.

The historic church was built starting in 1889. St. Willebrord Catholic Church was a regular place of worship for Vince Lombardi and is one of the stops on the Packers Heritage Trail.

References 

Packers Heritage Trail
Tourist attractions in Brown County, Wisconsin
Churches in the Roman Catholic Diocese of Green Bay
Churches in Brown County, Wisconsin
Religious organizations established in 1864
[[Category: